Blepharophimosis is a congenital anomaly in which the eyelids are underdeveloped such that they cannot open as far as usual and permanently cover part of the eyes. Both the vertical and horizontal palpebral fissures (eyelid openings) are shortened; the eyes also appear spaced more widely apart as a result, known as telecanthus.

Presentation
In addition to small palpebral fissures, features can include epicanthus inversus (fold curving in the mediolateral direction, inferior to the inner canthus), low nasal bridge, ptosis of the eyelids and telecanthus.

Associated conditions

Blepharophimosis, ptosis, epicanthus inversus syndrome 
Blepharophimosis forms a part of blepharophimosis, ptosis, epicanthus inversus syndrome (BPES), also called blepharophimosis syndrome, which is an autosomal dominant condition characterised by blepharophimosis, ptosis (upper eyelid drooping), epicanthus inversus (skin folds by the nasal bridge, more prominent lower than upper lid) and telecanthus (widening of the distance between the inner corners of the eyelids). The nasal bridge is flat and there is a hypoplastic orbital rim. It may also be associated with lop ears, ectropion and hypertelorism.

There are two known types, type 1 and type 2. Although research is limited, it is known that type 1 and 2 are expressed with the same symptoms mentioned above, but type 1 also has the characteristic of premature ovarian insufficiency (POI) in women, which causes menopausal symptoms in patients as young as 15 years old. This is due to the shortening of the FOXL2 gene.

History 
Vignes (1889) probably first described this entity, a dysplasia of the eyelids.

See also
 Ankyloblepharon

References

External links

Congenital disorders of eyes
Disorders of eyelid, lacrimal system and orbit